Matthew 10 is the tenth chapter in the Gospel of Matthew in the New Testament section of the Christian Bible. This chapter opens with Jesus calling some of his disciples and sending them out to preach and heal. This section is also known as the Mission Discourse or the Little Commission, in contrast to the Great Commission at the end of the gospel (Matthew 28:18–20). The Little Commission is directed specifically to the "lost sheep of the house of Israel", while the Great Commission is directed to all nations. The Pulpit Commentary suggests that Jesus' message in this discourse "was hardly likely to have been remembered outside Jewish Christian circles".

Matthew names the twelve apostles, or "twelve disciples", in verses 2 to 4 and gives them careful instruction as they travel around Israel. The remainder of the chapter consists almost entirely of sayings attributed to Jesus. Many of the sayings found in Matthew 10 are also found in Luke 10 and the Gospel of Thomas, which is not part of the accepted canon of the New Testament.

Text

The oldest known texts were written in Koine Greek. This chapter is divided into 42 verses.

Textual witnesses
Some early manuscripts containing the text of this chapter are:
Papyrus 110 (3rd/4th century; extant verses 13–15, 25–27)
Uncial 0171 (~300; extant verses 17–23, 25–32)
Codex Vaticanus (325–350)
Codex Sinaiticus (330–360; complete)
Codex Bezae (~400)
Papyrus 19 (4th/5th century; extant verses 32–42)
Codex Ephraemi Rescriptus (~450; complete)
Codex Petropolitanus Purpureus (6th century)

The twelve (10:1–15)
The text in verse 1 refers to "his twelve disciples" (tous dōdeka mathētas autou). Verse 2 calls them "the twelve apostles" (tōn dōdeka apostolōn):

Verse 5 refers to them simply as "the twelve" (tous dōdeka) but the verb which follows is "ἀπέστειλεν" (apesteilen), meaning "sent forth".

Verses 17-39
The Jerusalem Bible refers to these verses as a "missionary's handbook", and suggests that their scope is wider than that of the "first mission of the apostles" in verses 1-16.

Verse 34

"Think not that I am come to send peace on earth: I came not to send [or bring] peace, but a sword."

This is a much-discussed passage, often explained in terms of the "apocalyptic-eschatological" context of the 1st century.

R. T. France explains the verse, in context with the subsequent verse 35: "The sword Jesus brings is not here military conflict, but, as vv. 35–36 show, a sharp social division which even severs the closest family ties. … Jesus speaks here, as in the preceding and following verses, more of a division in men’s personal response to him."

Verse 38

And he who does not take his cross and follow after Me is not worthy of Me.
"Take his cross": is in the sense of "willingly to undergo the severe trials that fall to his lot"; a figurative expression taken from the practice that "condemned criminals were compelled to take up their own cross and carry it to the place of execution".

Parallels in the Gospel of Thomas
Matthew 10 contains many parallels found in the Gospel of Thomas.
Matthew 10:16 parallels saying 39 in the Gospel of Thomas.
Matthew 10:37 parallels sayings 55 and 101
Matthew 10:27b parallels saying 33a.
Matthew 10:34–36 parallels saying 16.
Matthew 10:26 parallels saying 5b.

See also
Commissioning of the Twelve Apostles
Coming Persecutions

Notes

References

External links

 King James Bible - Wikisource
English Translation with Parallel Latin Vulgate
Online Bible at GospelHall.org (ESV, KJV, Darby, American Standard Version, Bible in Basic English)
Multiple bible versions at Bible Gateway (NKJV, NIV, NRSV etc.)

 
Matthew 10